Agent Vinod is a 1977 Indian Hindi-language action spy film directed by Deepak Bahry. The film stars  Mahendra Sandhu as a dashing Indian secret agent and Jagdeep as a comic side-kick. This movie turned out to be a surprise hit. Its title was reused in the 2012 Hindi film of the same name, however, it isn't a remake.

Story
The kidnapping of a prominent scientist, Ajay Saxena (Nazir Hussain) prompts the Chief of Secret Services (K.N. Singh) to assign flamboyant Agent Vinod (Mahendra Sandhu) to this case. While on this assignment, Vinod meets with Ajay's daughter, Anju (Asha Sachdev), who insists on assisting him. The duo are then further assisted by Chandu "James Bond" (Jagdeep) and his gypsy girlfriend (Jayshree T.). The two couples will soon have numerous challenges thrust on them, and will realize that their task is not only very difficult, but also life-threatening.

Cast
Mahendra Sandhu as Agent Vinod
Asha Sachdev as Anju Saxena
Rehana Sultan as Zarina
Jagdeep as Chandu alias James Bond
Iftekhar as Madanlal
Pinchoo Kapoor as Chacha of Agent Vinod
Nazir Hussain as Ashok Saxena (Anju's dad) (as Nazir Husain)
Ravindra Kapoor
K.N. Singh as Chief of Agent Vinod
Helen as Dancer - Lovelina
Jayshree T. as Gypsy Sardar's daughter
Leena Das as Leena (Chacha's assistant)
Viju Khote as Madanlal's henchman
Sharat Saxena as Madanlal's henchman 
Birbal as Room Service Boy
Bhagwan Dada as Gypsy Sardar
V. Gopal as Hotel Manager
Sunder as Priest

Music

References

External links
 

Films scored by Raamlaxman
1977 films
Indian spy action films
1970s Hindi-language films
1970s spy action films
Rajshri Productions films
Fictional Indian secret agents
Films about kidnapping in India
Intelligence Bureau (India) in fiction
Hindi-language action films
Films about nuclear technology
Films about nuclear war and weapons
Films directed by Deepak Bahry